Willoughby is a city in Lake County, Ohio and is a suburb of Cleveland. The population was 22,268 at the time of the 2010 census.

History 

Willoughby's first permanent settler was David Abbott in 1798, who operated a gristmill. Abbott and his family were said to have had close relations with a band of Indians along the banks of the local river, which the Indians called the "Sha-ga-rin" meaning "Clear Water." This river was later called the Chagrin River, though the origin of the name remains in dispute.

In 1835, the village was permanently named "Willoughby" in honor of Westel Willoughby, Jr., a public health official that the founders of a short-lived Medical College, which was based in the city, hoped to attract to the area. Many historical buildings from this period survive to this date, affording the downtown Willoughby area some outstanding specimens of 19th century architecture.

In World War I, the U.S. Army chose Willoughby as the site for a chemical weapons plant producing lewisite.

Over time, Willoughby sent citizens into every major U.S. military conflict. Several memorials and historical relics are displayed in Wes Point Park, the center of downtown Willoughby, to honor those that have served.

Willoughby is the only town in America that has belonged, at one time or other, to six counties (Washington, Jefferson, Trumbull, Geauga, Cuyahoga, and Lake).

Geography
Willoughby is located at  (41.645915, -81.408515).

Demographics

2010 census
At the 2010 census there were 22,268 people in 10,413 households, including 5,716 families, in the city. The racial makeup of the city was 93.6% White, 3.1% African American, 0.1% Native American, 1.5% Asian, 0.2% from other races, and 1.5% from two or more races. Hispanic or Latino of any race were 1.3%.

Of the 10,413 households 23.7% had children under the age of 18 living with them, 39.1% were married couples living together, 11.7% had a female householder with no husband present, 4.1% had a male householder with no wife present, and 45.1% were non-families. 38.4% of households were one person and 16.2% were one person aged 65 or older. The average household size was 2.12 and the average family size was 2.83.

The median age was 43.6 years. 19.1% of residents were under the age of 18; 7.5% were between the ages of 18 and 24; 25.2% were from 25 to 44; 29.1% were from 45 to 64; and 19.1% were 65 or older. The gender makeup of the city was 46.8% male and 53.2% female.

2000 census
At the 2000 census there were 22,621 people in 10,265 households, including 5,892 families, in the city. The population density was 2,225.3 people per square mile (858.8/km). There were 10,700 housing units at an average density of 1,052.6 per square mile (406.2/km). The racial makeup of the city was 96.47% White, 1.14% African American, 0.17% Native American, 1.15% Asian, 0.06% Pacific Islander, 0.11% from other races, and 0.90% from two or more races. Hispanic or Latino of any race were 0.71%. 19.0% were of German, 15.8% Italian, 13.3% Irish, 8.2% English, 5.6% Polish, 5.6% American and 5.4% Slovene ancestry according to Census 2000.

Of the 10,265 households 25.2% had children under the age of 18 living with them, 42.8% were married couples living together, 11.1% had a female householder with no husband present, and 42.6% were non-families. 36.6% of households were one person and 13.9% were one person aged 65 or older. The average household size was 2.17 and the average family size was 2.87.

The age distribution was 21.1% under the age of 18, 7.3% from 18 to 24, 31.5% from 25 to 44, 22.5% from 45 to 64, and 17.5% 65 or older. The median age was 39 years. For every 100 females, there were 85.4 males. For every 100 females age 18 and over, there were 81.9 males.

The median household income was $43,387 and the median family income was $53,677. Males had a median income of $38,711 versus $30,553 for females. The per capita income for the city was $23,653. About 4.3% of families and 5.8% of the population were below the poverty line, including 8.4% of those under age 18 and 7.6% of those age 65 or over.

Education
Two public high schools are located in Willoughby: Willoughby South High School and Willoughby-Eastlake Technical Center, both of which are a part of the Willoughby-Eastlake School District. Students in the ninth through twelfth grades are enrolled at Willoughby South High School, which opened its doors at its present location in 2019. Previously, Willoughby South High School and current rival Eastlake North High were housed in the same building called Union High, but following the division, the then-abandoned Union High became the location of Willoughby Junior High School until 1972. It then housed the Willoughby-Eastlake Technical Center, located in downtown Willoughby. In 2011, the proposed Five-Year Facilities Plan would add 2 new buildings to the district, a new Longfellow Elementary, a new Eastlake North High School, renovate Willoughby South High School, add a new school to the building as well as move Willoughby Middle School to the previous building. Construction for these buildings began in Fall 2016 and ended Fall 2019. The demolition of the old Willoughby Middle, Longfellow Elementary, and North High School began and ended Summer 2019.

The Andrews Osborne Academy is also located in Willoughby.

Willoughby is served by a branch of the Willoughby-Eastlake Public Library.

Economy

Top employers
According to the city's 2009 Comprehensive Annual Financial Report, the top employers in the city were:

News, media, and sports

 The News-Herald, a Lake County newspaper, has been headquartered in Willoughby since its inception.
 Willoughby Today is an online news website founded in August 2010 for Willoughby.
 WINT 1330AM is licensed to Willoughby and serves the surrounding area.

Notable people
 Tim Conway, actor
 Ethan Carter III, professional wrestler
 James Emery, jazz musician
 Greg Harbaugh, NASA
 Kareem Hunt, professional football player
 Katie McGregor, athlete
 Ricky Stanzi, professional football player
 Lyn St. James, auto racer
 Betty Thomas, actress, director, writer
 Elizabeth Augustus Whitehead, archaeologist and philanthropist

References

Further reading

External links

 
 Willoughby Area Welcome Center
 Willoughby branch of the Willoughby-Eastlake Public Library

Cities in Ohio
Cities in Lake County, Ohio
Populated places established in 1798
Cleveland metropolitan area
1798 establishments in the Northwest Territory